Victor Manuel Pérez (born June 18, 1973) is an American politician who sat in the California State Assembly as a Democrat.  On May 9, 2017, California Governor Jerry Brown appointed him to the Riverside County Board of Supervisors, replacing the late John Benoit.

Biography
"Manny" Perez was born in Indio, California, and raised in Riverside and Imperial counties by his parents, who met working in the area's agricultural fields. He attended public schools, including UC Riverside, then returned home to teach before earning a master's degree at Harvard University.

Pérez is one of ten co-founders of an organization called La Union Estudiantil de la Raza (U.E.R.), established on October 6, 1992. UER is located at the University of California Riverside.

As a member of the Coachella Valley School Board, Perez secured $250 million to build new facilities. As a healthcare director, he worked towards expanding health coverage for everyone in the district, with an emphasis on providing services for children, expecting mothers and seniors in need of medicine.

2008 California State Assembly run
In June 2008, Pérez won his party's nomination as the Democratic candidate in California's 80th State Assembly district, which includes the eastern portion of Riverside County and all of Imperial County He was elected to the assembly in November 2008 and took office in December.

Pérez said that his priorities as an assembly member will be economic growth, stronger schools, expanded healthcare and environmental protection.

References

Marcel Honoré, "Jeandron, Perez Draw Contrasts in Debate", The Desert Sun, September 19, 2008.

External links
VoteSmart biography page for Manuel Perez
V. Manuel Perez at Join California

1973 births
Harvard University alumni
Hispanic and Latino American state legislators in California
Living people
County supervisors in California
Democratic Party members of the California State Assembly
People from Coachella, California
People from Indio, California
School board members in California
University of California, Riverside alumni
21st-century American politicians